Mohan Kapur (born 27 October 1965) is an Indian actor, voice artist and television host who works predominantly in Hindi films and television.

Career
Mohan is famous for being the first television personality in South Asia (which includes: India, Pakistan, Sri Lanka) as the host of the first South Asian original programme produced by a satellite network (Zee TV), Saanp Seedi (Snakes & Ladders). Saanp Seedi was the first and only television series launched on satellite in the Asia-Pacific's from 1992 - 1994 which included Pakistan, Nepal and Sri Lanka. Saanp Seedi is best described as a combination game, variety and talk show starring Kapur with frequent celebrity guests.  His TV success led to a crossover in the Indian Film Industry, his first role being the lead antagonist in Beqabu (1996) which eventually led to a career appearing in over 60 film and TV series. He often plays the good guy turned bad, the "surprise antagonist", such as his roles in the Disney+ Hotstar film Sadak 2 (2020) and his award nominated performance in the Hindi remake of the Israeli series for Disney+ Hotstar Hostages (2019-2020).

Kapur is also known for his work as a voice artist and has dubbed for numerous Hollywood actors including Dwayne Johnson, Tom Hardy, Nicolas Cage, and Jackie Chan.

Kapur has also voiced Doctor Strange in Hindi dubs of his various appearances throughout the Marvel Cinematic Universe. In 2021, he was cast as Yusuf Khan in the MCU titles Ms. Marvel and The Marvels. Kapur is fluent in English, Punjabi and Hindi.

Kapur has been seen in 2013's black comedy Jolly LLB, directed by Subhash Kapoor, Happy New Year, and Mission Mangal.

Filmography

Films

Television

Dubbing roles

Live action films

Animated films

TV series

See also
Dubbing (filmmaking)
List of Indian Dubbing Artists

References

External links
 

Living people
21st-century Indian male actors
Indian male voice actors
Male actors in Hindi cinema
Indian male television actors
1965 births
Place of birth missing (living people)
Indian television presenters